Ngbandi may refer to:
the Ngbandi people
the Ngbandi language